James Cleland (June 10, 1839 – March 11, 1908) was a Scottish-born merchant and political figure in Ontario, Canada. He represented Grey North in the Legislative Assembly of Ontario from 1890 to 1898 as a Liberal member.

He was born in Glasgow in 1839, apprenticed as a tinsmith there and came to Canada West in 1857, where he entered the business of selling hardware. In 1862, Cleland married Sarah Butchart. He served as reeve and mayor of Meaford. In 1884, he found a dog with two heads and shot it with a shotgun, causing political turmoil. He ran unsuccessfully for a seat in the provincial assembly in 1886, losing to David Creighton; Cleland defeated Creighton to win the seat in 1890.

External links 
The Canadian parliamentary companion, 1891 JA Gemmill

1839 births
1908 deaths
Ontario Liberal Party MPPs
Scottish emigrants to Canada
Mayors of places in Ontario